Qanat-e Kohan-e Deh Shoyib (also Romanized as Qanāt-e Kohan-e Deh Shoʿyīb; also known as Qanāt-e Kohan-e Shoaybdeh) is a village in Heruz Rural District, Kuhsaran District, Ravar County, Kerman Province, Iran. At the 2006 census, its population was 46, in 14 families.

References 

Populated places in Ravar County